The Social Democratic Party of Yugoslavia was a political party in the Kingdom of Yugoslavia.

Party was founded during foundation of the Kingdom of Serbs, Croats and Slovenes around group of former Social Democratic Party of Croatia and Slavonia inside Socialist Workers' Party of Yugoslavia (of Communists) led by Vitomir Korać. Party dissolved on 18 December 1921, when it merged into the Socialist Party of Yugoslavia.

Sources
 Toma Milenković, Socijalistička partija Jugoslavije (1921-1929), “Institut za suvremenu istoriju”, Beograd, 1974.
 

Political parties in the Kingdom of Yugoslavia
Political parties established in 1920
Political parties disestablished in 1921
Socialism in the Kingdom of Yugoslavia